Hugo is a statutory town in and the county seat of Lincoln County, Colorado, United States.  The town population was 730 at the U.S. Census 2010.

History
In about 1859 the town was developed as a cattle ranching community to supply miners with provisions. The town was also used as a local stage coach stop.

There are two stories  as to how the town obtained its name. One version says the town was named by the Kansas Pacific Railroad builders after pioneer stage agent (Overland company), Hugo Richards. Richards later moved to Prescott, Arizona where he became town banker and businessman. Another story says the town was named for Richard Hugo who was a local settler. The town was founded in 1870, and incorporated in 1909.

In July 2016, the water supply for the town of Hugo was purportedly contaminated by THC, the main psychoactive component in cannabis.  Subsequent testing found no THC in the water supply, and authorities believe the initial tests were false positives.

Demographics

At of the census of 2000, there were 885 people, 353 households, and 230 families residing in the town. The racial makeup of the town was 96.38% White, 0.79% African American, 1.24% Native American, 0.45% from other races, and 1.13% from two or more races. Hispanic or Latino of any race were 3.84% of the population.

There were 353 households, out of which 31.4% had children under the age of 18 living with them, 52.1% were married couples living together, 11.0% had a female householder with no husband present, and 34.6% were non-families. 30.9% of all households were made up of individuals, and 13.6% had someone living alone who was 65 years of age or older.  The average household size was 2.35 and the average family size was 2.94.

In the town, the population was spread out, with 25.2% under the age of 18, 7.3% from 18 to 24, 26.0% from 25 to 44, 23.7% from 45 to 64, and 17.7% who were 65 years of age or older.  The median age was 39 years. For every 100 females, there were 85.5 males.  For every 100 females age 18 and over, there were 81.9 males.

The median income for a household in the town was $30,259, and the median income for a family was $36,667. Males had a median income of $29,583 versus $20,536 for females. The per capita income for the town was $15,669.  About 10.4% of families and 12.3% of the population were below the poverty line, including 14.2% of those under age 18 and 15.7% of those age 65 or over.

Geography
Hugo is located at  (39.133520, -103.468089).

Hugo's elevation is 5,039 ft.

Climate
According to the Köppen Climate Classification system, Hugo has a cold semi-arid climate, abbreviated "BSk" on climate maps.

Education
Hugo is served by the Genoa-Hugo School District No. C-113 and includes Genoa-Hugo Elementary School, Genoa-Hugo Middle School and Genoa-Hugo High School.

Hugo also has a town public library with about 8,000 volumes, 180 video materials and 100 audio materials. The library is located in the Hugo municipal building.

Culture
Hugo has the Eastern Trails Museum and Cultural Arts Center, the historic Hugo Kansas-Pacific/Union Pacific Roundhouse, the Union Pacific Train Depot Town Museum, and the historic Hedlund Museum House, the vintage swimming pool of which are all located in Hugo.

Recreation
Hugo's municipal public park (Hines Park) features a vintage swimming pool which was constructed as a Works Project Administration facility in the 1930s and is designated as a historic site by the National Register of Historic Places.  There is also a picnic area, playgrounds, a volleyball court as well as a basketball court. The municipal building has a racquetball court on its grounds. The Coulson Nature Trail is a 2.5-mile wildlife and nature hiking trail on the outskirts of town. Kinney Lake State Wildlife Area is 14 miles south of Hugo, and features a 10-acre lake for fishing and recreation as well as camping and hunting of deer, antelope, rabbit, coyote, waterfowl during the licensed season.

Media
The Eastern Colorado Plainsman is the weekly newspaper serving Hugo and the surrounding communities. It has a weekly circulation of 1,200. There is an FM radio station licensed for Hugo, as well as an AM radio station in Limon — which is about 15 miles northwest of Hugo, and there is a television repeater station and tower in Flagler which is about 35 miles northeast of Hugo.

Notable people
 Carl "Bev" Bledsoe - The longest serving Speaker of the Colorado State House of Representatives was a rancher from Hugo. Bledsoe, a Republican, was first elected to the state legislature in 1972 and served as Speaker from 1981 to 1991.

See also

 List of municipalities in Colorado

References

External links

 
 CDOT map of the Town of Hugo

Towns in Lincoln County, Colorado
Towns in Colorado
County seats in Colorado
Populated places established in 1870
1870 establishments in Colorado Territory